The Irish Wallball Nationals is a wallball/one-wall handball tournament held annually in Ireland in early July. The tournament is the main wallball/One-wall handball on the Irish handball calendar.

Events and venues
The Nationals feature men's and women's singles; with Senior/Open, B, C, 23 and under (23&U), 19 and under (19&U), Masters and Juvenile grades. Since 2009, the games are normally held in a 5-court venue in the Sports Arena at Breaffy House Hotel in Castlebar. For 2022, the Irish Wallball Nationals were planned for Roscommon venues as the Breaffy House Sports Arena was unavailable.

Management
The Irish Wallball Nationals is managed by GAA Handball, formerly the Irish Handball Council.

History
The event was first played in County Meath in 1997 before moving to Sligo where it was hosted for several years before moving to its current, multi-court venue, Breaffy House Hotel in County Mayo in 2009. The 2022 Nationals were scheduled to take place across three Roscommon venues - Kilglass GAC, Strokestown CS, and the Convent of Mercy Roscommon, as Breaffy House Arena is unavailable to host the tournament this year. The three-court venue in Kilglass was set as the main venue for finals / premier grades.

Champions
Mens Open:

Women's Open:

See also 
 European 1-Wall Tour
 Handball International Championships
 GAA Handball
 UK Wallball
 United States Handball Association
 International Ball game Confederation (CIJB)
 Valencian Pilota Federation (Fedpival)
 Gaelic handball
 American handball
 Basque pelota
 Pêl-Law (Welsh handball)
 Valencian frontó

References

Gaelic handball
1997 establishments in Ireland
Annual sporting events in Ireland
Recurring sporting events established in 1997
July sporting events